In organic chemistry, a propynyl group is a propyl bearing a triple bond.
 The 1-propynyl group has the structure CH3-C≡C–R.
 The 2-propynyl group is also known as a propargyl group, and has the structure HC≡C−CH2–R.

References 

Alkynyl groups